Penicillium restingae is a species of fungus in the genus Penicillium which was isolated from soil of the Guaibim sandbank in Bahia in Brazil.

References

Further reading 
 

restingae
Fungi described in 2014